Beauty Thulani Zibula is a South African politician and a member of the National Assembly of South Africa. Zibula is a member of the African National Congress.

Parliamentary career
Zibula was a parliamentary candidate for the African National Congress in the 2019 general elections. She was the 16th candidate on the ANC's list in  KwaZulu-Natal. She was elected to the National Assembly as the ANC won 24 list seats in the province. As a member of the National Assembly, she is a member of the Standing Committee on Public Accounts.

In the 2019 Register of Members' Interest, Zibula disclosed that as chair of the Clothing Manufactory Chamber of the National Bargaining Council, she received R13 935.48.

References

External links

Profile at Parliament of South Africa

Living people
Place of birth missing (living people)
Year of birth missing (living people)
Zulu people
People from KwaZulu-Natal
Members of the National Assembly of South Africa
Women members of the National Assembly of South Africa
African National Congress politicians